Lalmohania velutina is a species of filefish known only from the Gulf of Mannar in India.  This species grows to a length of  SL.  This species is the only known member of its genus.

References

Monacanthidae
Fish described in 1994